William Wobbler is a video game developed by Antony Crowther and released by Wizard Development in 1985 for the Commodore 64 and ZX Spectrum.

Gameplay
The player must guide William to find ten pieces of a puzzle, hidden throughout a vast landscape of caverns.

Competition

The game was distributed with a second disk labelled "Competition Disk." When the game was completed, a file was to be saved to this disk and sent to Wizard Development who awarded an undisclosed prize for the first entry received.

References

1985 video games
Commodore 64 games
Video games developed in the United Kingdom
ZX Spectrum games